The 1958 Navy Midshipmen football team represented the United States Naval Academy (USNA) as an independent during the 1958 NCAA University Division football season. They began the season ranked 7th in the pre-season AP Poll. The team was led by ninth-year head coach Eddie Erdelatz.

Schedule

References

Navy
Navy Midshipmen football seasons
Navy Midshipmen football